William Thomas Rickard,  (10 February 1828 – 21 February 1905) was a British sailor and a recipient of the Victoria Cross, the highest award for gallantry in the face of the enemy that can be awarded to British and Commonwealth forces.

Early life and Royal Navy
William Thomas Rickard was born at Stoke Damerel, Devonport, on 10 February 1828, and at an early age joined the Royal Navy.

Rickard was 27 years old, and a quartermaster in the Royal Navy during the Crimean War when the following deed took place for which he was awarded the Victoria Cross.

After a difficult and dangerous journey they reached their objective—the magazine of corn—and managed to ignite the stacks, but the guards were alerted and immediately opened fire and gave chase. The pursuit was so hot that the seaman, through fatigue, fell into the mud and could not extricate himself. Rickard, however, although he was himself exhausted, went back and assisted him. The three men finally reached their ship and later the look-outs reported that the fodder store had burned to the ground.

His VC is on display in the Lord Ashcroft Gallery at the Imperial War Museum, London.

Later life and family
After retiring from the navy, Rickard joined the Coastguard Service as boatman, Chief Boatman and latterly as Chief Officer of Coast Guards, retiring sometime in the 1870s.

In June 1860, Richard married Rebecca Whitingham of Kingsbridge, and they had four sons and two daughters. In retirement Rickard was boatman to the Ryde Rowing Club in the Isle of Wight and he and his family lived at Arethusa Cottage, Smallbrook, Ryde, named after the frigate  on which he first served in the Crimean conflict. He died on 21 February 1905 and is buried in Ryde cemetery.

References

External links
Location of grave and VC medal (Isle of Wight)

Crimean War recipients of the Victoria Cross
Royal Navy personnel of the Crimean War
British recipients of the Victoria Cross
Recipients of the Conspicuous Gallantry Medal
Royal Navy sailors
Military personnel from Devonport, Plymouth
1828 births
1905 deaths
Royal Navy recipients of the Victoria Cross
Chevaliers of the Légion d'honneur